Vernon-Harcourt is a surname:

Augustus George Vernon Harcourt (1834–1919), English chemist
Edward Vernon Harcourt (1825–1891), English politician and naturalist
George Vernon Harcourt (1874–1934), Ontario politician
Leveson Francis Vernon-Harcourt (1839–1907), British civil engineer
Lewis Vernon Harcourt, 1st Viscount Harcourt (1863–1922), British politician
Octavius Vernon Harcourt (1793–1863), British naval officer
William Vernon Harcourt (disambiguation), several people

Other
Mount Vernon Harcourt, Antarctic mountain

See also
Harcourt-Vernon
Venables-Vernon-Harcourt
Harcourt (surname)
Vernon family

Compound surnames
Surnames of English origin
Surnames of Norman origin